The Challenger de Drummondville, currently sponsored as Challenger Banque Nationale de Drummondville, is a professional tennis tournament held in Drummondville, Quebec, Canada since 2015. It was held in Rimouski, Quebec, Canada from 2006 to 2014. The event is part of the ATP Challenger Tour and is played on indoor hard courts.

Past finals

Singles

Doubles

References

External links
Official website

 
ATP Challenger Tour
Tennis tournaments in Canada
Hard court tennis tournaments
Sport in Drummondville
Tennis in Quebec
Recurring sporting events established in 2006
2006 establishments in Quebec